The 1953–54 Penn State Nittany Lions basketball team represented Pennsylvania State University in intercollegiate basketball during the 1953–54 season. The team finished the season with an 18–6 record and made it to the 1954 NCAA tournament's Final Four, their only Final Four appearance in school history. Penn State posted an upset of eighth-ranked Louisiana State University and ended Notre Dame's 18-game winning streak to advance to Kansas City where they eventually finished third after a loss to eventual champion La Salle.

Schedule and results

|-
!colspan=9 style="background:#1C3C6B; color:#FFFFFF;"|  Regular season

|-
!colspan=9 style="background:#1C3C6B; color:#FFFFFF;"| 1954 NCAA Tournament

Source

Rankings

References

Penn State Nittany Lions basketball seasons
NCAA Division I men's basketball tournament Final Four seasons
Penn State
Penn State
Penn State Nittany Lions Basketball Team
Penn State Nittany Lions Basketball Team